James Byrne (born 15 April 1890) was an Irish Gaelic football administrator, referee and player who enjoyed a lengthy career as a left corner-back with the Wexford senior team.  He joined the team in 1913 and was a regular member of the starting fifteen until 1925.

Kennelly is regarded as one of Wexford's greatest-ever players. He won four consecutive All-Ireland winners' medals and seven Leinster winners' medals.  An All-Ireland runner-up on two occasions, Byrne captained the team to the All-Ireland title in 1918.

At club level Byrne enjoyed a lengthy career with Geraldine O'Hanrahan's.

References

 

1890 births
All-Ireland-winning captains (football)
Geraldine O'Hanrahan's Gaelic footballers
Wexford inter-county Gaelic footballers
Carlow Gaelic footballers
Winners of four All-Ireland medals (Gaelic football)
Year of death missing